The Z11 was a computer, the first serially produced machine of the Zuse KG.

Weighing , in 1955 it was built with relays and stepwise relays. Beginning in 1957 the Z11 could be programmed by punched tapes.  It consumed 2 kW of electricity, and operated mechanically at a frequency of 10 to 20 Hz.  Both input and output were in decimal numbers, and it used floating-point arithmetic.

The Z11 was first presented on the Hannover Messe in 1957. Today the German Museum of Technology and the Museum of Technology in Vienna exhibit one of the surviving Z11s.

External links
 Z11 information

1950s computers
Computer-related introductions in 1955
Konrad Zuse
Computers designed in Germany